Zuta Mary Nartey (also referred to as Mary Zutah Narteh, born 14 November 1987) is a Ghanaian javelin thrower.

Javelin 
In 2012 she placed fourth in the African Championships in Athletics in Porto Novo with 49.69 meters.

In 2014, she placed eleventh at the Commonwealth Games in Glasgow, won silver at the African Championships in Athletics in Marrakech with her personal best of 52.57 meters, and was eighth at the IAAF Continental Cup in Marrakech.

She also won the silver medal in the Africa Games in Brazzaville in 2015.

She placed ninth in 2016 in the African Championships in Athletics in Durban with 45.40 meters.

In 2018 she got the silver medal in the Sekondi-Takoradi GAA(Ghana Athletics Association) Circuit with 45.35 meters.

Shot put 
In 2002 Nartey set a shot put record of 11.70 meters while in Osei Kyeretwie Senior High School during the Ashanti Regional Super Zonal athletics competition that lasted for 18 years until it was broken by Rashida Abass of Prempeh College in 2019.

References

External links 
 Athlete profile, IAAF

1987 births
Ghanaian javelin throwers
Ghanaian female athletes
Living people
African Games silver medalists for Ghana
African Games medalists in athletics (track and field)
Athletes (track and field) at the 2015 African Games
Athletes (track and field) at the 2014 Commonwealth Games
Commonwealth Games competitors for Ghana
20th-century Ghanaian women
21st-century Ghanaian women